Commodore Park is a mostly residential neighbourhood in the Dartmouth community of the Halifax Regional Municipality, Nova Scotia. It is located in the east end of Dartmouth in the Woodlawn area. Prince Andrew High School is located within this area.

History 
Commodore Park was established as a subdivision during the general housing boom in Dartmouth in the 1950s. By 1955, 200 building lots had been set aside and 50 houses had been built. The subdivision was developed by Commodore Company Limited. The land comprising the area was originally owned by various landowners, including Bert C. Farquharson and Allison R. Morash. Their names are reflected in the area's Farquharson Street and Morash Pond.

Prince Andrew High School was built in 1960, shortly before the town and county areas of Dartmouth (including Woodlawn) were amalgamated into the City of Dartmouth in 1961.

Street names 
Many of the streets in Commodore Park were named for Canadian naval ships that were lost during the Second World War:

There are many websites describing the ships. One of the more detailed ones is www.uboat.net.

Gallery 
These plaques were placed in a small park in the center of Commodore Park as a part of the Commodore Park project.

References

Communities in Halifax, Nova Scotia
Dartmouth, Nova Scotia